Yeh Chanda Kanoon Hai is an Indian courtroom comedy series starring Juhi Parmar Saanand Verma and Aasif Sheikh and aired on SAB TV from 2009 to 2010.

Plot
Yeh Chanda Kanoon Hai is based on the life of the protagonist Chanda Rani, who is a lawyer and is secretly divorced from another lawyer and her main rival, Vibhuti Narayan. Much of the show takes place in a courtroom. The judge, Prem Kapoor, often shows a soft side towards Chanda Rani, which irritates Vibhuti Narayan, who still has tender feelings for his ex-wife. Each episode deals with a new case, often bizarre, featuring interesting characters.

Main characters

Chanda Rani
She is the protagonist of the serial. She is secretly divorced from Vibhuti Narayan. Her charm, smartness and acting skills help her take an advantage in any case she fights, especially because the judge has a soft corner for her. She is extremely determined to beat her ex-husband Vibhuti in every case they fight to show that even a wife can beat a husband in his own game.

Vibhuti Narayan
Young and intelligent, he comes from a family of lawyers and thinks that he is bigger than the biggest in his profession. Initially, he gets very irritated when his divorced wife, Chanda Rani, comes to the court where he practices law but later on reveals that he still has tender feelings for her. He often recollects memories from their life together, especially when he and Chanda are alone. The exact reason for their divorce has not been fully explored on the show.
He shares a bitter-sweet relationship with the Judge. He believes that Prem Kapoor has no credibility of becoming a judge and gets particularly irritated when he tries to flirt with Chanda. Vibhuti also blackmails the judge by saying that he will report the judge's doings to his wife.

Prem Kapoor
He is the Judge. He is happy-go-lucky and has a crush on Chanda Rani, the lawyer, and is partial towards her much to the irritation of Vibhuti. He is also extremely forgetful and has a habit of saying the wrong things at the wrong times. It is his bright "Ardali" who saves the day for him.
He gives a judgement of "hang till death" in the pettiest of cases. He is also extremely afraid of his formidable wife.

Cast

Juhi Parmar as Chanda Rani Lawyer
Aasif Sheikh as Vibhuti Narayan Lawyer
Tiku Talsania as Prem Kapoor Judge
Rishina Kandhari as Munmun (Havaldar and then as Vibhuti's assistant lawyer)
Neelesh Malviya as Chapal (Chanda Rani's assistant lawyer)
Rajkumar Kanojia as ardali
Farzil Pardiwalla as Jholkar Havaldar
Shikha Chitambare as Lopa ; Vibhuti Narayan’s assistant who has a crush on him.

References

External links

Sony SAB original programming
Indian television series
Indian comedy television series